On December 14, 1983, a TAMPA Colombia Boeing 707 crashed after taking off from Olaya Herrera Airport in Medellín, Colombia on a ferry flight, killing all three people on board and 22 more people on the ground.

Aircraft 
The aircraft involved in the accident was a Boeing 707-373C with serial number 18707. The aircraft's maiden flight was in 1963, and it was delivered to World Airways as N375WA the same year. It was then operated by Britannia Airways, and British Caledonian as G-AYSI. In 1976, the aircraft was leased to Singapore Airlines for two months. The aircraft was then transferred to International Air Leases as N3751Y, who leased the aircraft to TAMPA Colombia in 1980.

Accident 
On the morning of December 14, 1983, the aircraft was scheduled to operate a cargo flight from Medellín to Miami. During takeoff the no. 4 (outer right) engine ingested foreign objects. The aircraft returned to Medellín where mechanics assessed the damage. They decided the aircraft would be ferried to Miami for repairs. The cargo was unloaded in preparation for the ferry flight.

Eight hours later, the aircraft took off with the no 4 engine idle. During the second takeoff attempt the no. 3 (inner right) engine failed. The aircraft banked to the right and crashed into a factory. All three crew members and 22 people on the ground were killed, while 15 more people on the ground were injured.

See also 
Transbrasil Flight 801

References 

Medellín
History of Colombia
Aviation accidents and incidents in Colombia
Aviation accidents and incidents in 1983
Airliner accidents and incidents caused by engine failure
Accidents and incidents involving the Boeing 707
December 1983 events
1983 disasters in Colombia